Woden Valley Youth Choir is a community choir based in Canberra, Australian Capital Territory. It performs not only in Canberra, but also across Australia and internationally during regular tours. The name derives from the Woden Valley district of Canberra.

There are six choirs, within the organisation, catering for different ages and voice ranges: 
 Leonis Voices (for ages 7 to 12)
 Australis Voices (for ages 12 to 25) 
 Centauri Voices (for youth with low and transitioning voices)
 Pegasi Vocal Ensemble (for ages 10 to 12)
 Spectra Vocal Ensemble (for ages 12 to 25) 

The Artistic Director of the choir and conductor of Australis Voices is Olivia Swift with Jade McFaul (Leonis), and Lucus Allerton (Centauri) also conductors for the choir.

One of the choir's biggest changes is the introduction of a group for young men, as previously, boys whose voices were transitioning from soprano and alto to tenor and bass were asked to leave the choir. Previous artistic director Kimberley Steele described the group as a "safe space to sing together" because "A lot of choirs are just treble choirs." Centauri Voices is also notable for being one of the few vocal ensembles in the ACT specifically for younger boys.

History
The Woden Valley Youth Choir began in February 1969 when conductor, Don Whitbread, and his pianist wife, Barbara, soon after they moved to Canberra, issued an invitation to local children. Beginning with twenty-two singers, the Choir grew to a regular membership of 70.

Memorable performances have included:
 1982 Commonwealth Games in Brisbane, Queensland - performing for Queen Elizabeth II and the Duke of Edinburgh at a Gala Concert;
 for the royals again, in Canberra in 1992;
 at the invitation of the Prime Minister of Australia, to sing to visiting Heads of Government at international conferences in 1981 and 1983;
 as invited guest artists at Government House, Canberra, the residence of the Governor-General of Australia;
 at the opening ceremony of the World Cup Athletics meet in 1985;
 in 1988:
 a world-wide telecast which launched Australia's Bicentennial year in 1988;
 12 choir members were in the Choir which sang at the official opening of Australian Parliament House;
 at Australia's official flag-raising ceremony at Expo 88 in Brisbane;
 at the prestigious International Society for Music Education (ISME) Conference;
 at the ceremony for the conferring of the Honorary Degree of Doctor of Laws on Nelson Mandela in 2000.
 at the opening of the Australian of the Year Walk in 2006.
 the opening of the Pacific School Games in 2008.
 as guest artists at the Male Choir Association of Australia 2008 Festival.
 at the Prime Minister's apology to Forgotten Australians and Child Migrants in 2009.
 singing with Opera Australia, symphony orchestras, and at major concerts with international guest artists;
 recording six albums and a one-hour television special;
 Voices in the Forest at the National Arboretum 
 many Canberra International Music Festivals 
 the annual concert held every year at various locations around Canberra such as Canberra Grammar School and Canberra College where many world premieres of pieces commissioned for the choir are held, previous examples include: 'Growing Into Me' by Sally Whitwell, 'Hawkesbury' by stephen Leek and 'Just Clowning Around' by Lucy Bermingham. 
 Albert Hall was used for the 50th anniversary annual concert
 six overseas tours
 the singing of the Australian National Anthem in the Aboriginal Ngunnawal language
 singing for the Queen's 70th Jubilee torch lighting with Prime Minister Anthony Albanese 

In 1996, Don Whitbread AOM retired as president and musical director of the choir. He was named Canberran of the Year for 1996.

In 2009, the choir celebrated its 40th anniversary with a concert at Llewellyn Hall including alumni and featuring two world premiers-Paul Jarman's 'Source of Life' and 'Fortyssimo' by Michelle Leonard and Sally Whitwell.

In 2010, the choir toured South Korea, hosted by the World Vision Korean Children's Choir.

At the end of 2016, Alpha Gregory stood down as Artistic Director after 20 years. Local musician and conductor, Kimberley Steele, became the choir's third Artistic Director on 1 January 2017.  In August 2018, Olivia Swift became Artistic Director.

In 2019 Woden Valley Youth Choir celebrated its 50th Anniversary.

Commissioned pieces  
The choir has had many pieces commissioned for them, some of which have become famous Australian choral works. Some of the commissioned pieces include:

 Australian Proverb- B. Robinson (2015)
 Hawkesbury-Stephen Leek (2014)
 Growing Into Me- Sally Whitwell (2014)
 Just Clowning Around- Lucy Bermingham (2013)
 Phonograph- Dan Walker (2013)
 Source of Life- Paul Jarman (2009)
 Fortyssimo- Michelle Leonard and Sally Whitwell (2009)
 Pemulwuy- Paul Jarman (2006)

Discography
The Choir can be heard on:
 I Hate Music (Collection of annual concert recordings 2013-2015)
 There's Nothing Like a Song (Live) (2010)
 Fortyssimo! Live (2009)
 Joyful Days (2007)
 Ancient Cries (2006)
 Holiday Lights
 Shine On Me (2002)
 Listen to the Angels Shouting (2000)
 The Woden Valley Youth Choir Live (1990)

Other albums:
 Macca on Air - Songs from Australia All Over
 the international Christmas CD, The Children's Gift, in company with the Vienna Boys Choir and other world-renowned choirs.
 Amani Celebration II

References

External links
 Woden Valley Youth Choir

Australian choirs
Choirs of children
Musical groups established in 1969